Little Lunch is an Australian children's mockumentary comedy-drama television series that first aired on ABC ME in 2015. The 26-part, 12 minute series is based on the books written by Danny Katz and illustrated by Mitch Vane. The series was adapted for television by Robyn Butler and Wayne Hope. The stories are set in the primary school playground at snack time and unfold through six children whose names are Atticus, Debra Jo, Rory, Melanie, Tamara and Battie as well as their teacher Mrs. Gonsha.

Two additional specials were filmed and screened in 2016: "The Halloween Horror Story" and "The Nightmare Before Graduation". The series was filmed at St Kilda Primary School in Melbourne, Australia.

Main plot
Little Lunch is set in a suburban primary school in Australia and follows the adventures of six Grade 5 students (listed below). In each episode, set at little lunch (or morning recess), the children tell stories about a scenario that happened at little lunch or events that happened outside class for example, a walk-a-thon, two pupils competing for who gets to go on the monkey bars or celebrating a birthday.

Cast and characters
 Flynn Curry as Rory: A naughty, distracted and very likeable student who is friends with Atticus. 
 Joshua Sitch as Atticus Busby: A sweet and nerdy student who is always hungry. He is friends with Rory but can get frustrated with his antics.
 Madison Lu as Melanie Woo: Stubborn, morally courageous, and shy
 Faith Seci as Debra-Jo: Smart, ambitious and organized, though some may call her bossy
 Olivia Deeble as Tamara Noodle: Excellent at sport and is not afraid to remind everyone
 Oisín O'Leary as Battie: The gentle, creative, daydreamer
 Heidi Arena as Mrs. Gonsha: Extremely patient and has a tendency to nod off in class

International broadcasts
This show airs in the United States on Universal Kids and in Canada on TVO.  The first season and specials are still available on Netflix in the UK. However, the US only had these until March 15, 2020.

In Vietnam, it is broadcast on VTV7 (Vietnam Television) from December 2019.

Home media
A two-disc DVD (PAL, Region 4) collection of the 26 episodes was published by the Australian Children's Television Foundation in 2017. The series and two specials are currently (January 2023) available for digital download from ACTF.

See also
 The InBESTigators

References

External links
 
 

Australian Broadcasting Corporation original programming
2015 Australian television series debuts
Australian children's television series
Australian comedy television series
Australian comedy-drama television series
Australian mockumentary television series
English-language television shows
Television series about children
Television shows set in Australia